The Teachability Hypothesis was produced by Manfred Pienemann. It was originally extracted from Pienemann's Processibility model. It proposes that learners will acquire a second language (L2) features if what is being taught is relatively close to their stage in language development.

Description 
The Teachability Hypothesis is based on previous psycholinguistic research in second language acquisition done by Meisel, Clahsen, and Pienemann (1981) and is reflective in Pienemann's Processibility theory. The hypothesis reports that some aspects of language are sequenced in a way that follows the developmental levels of language in which Pienemann coined those these features as 'developmental'. This sequence is reflective of the natural stages that learners will go through when learning a second language. Pienemann (1984) emphasizes that teachability of L2 structures have psychological constraints are universally shared. Language sequences have been reflected in wh-questions, some grammatical morphemes, negation, possessive determiners, and relative clause. Other features that do not have a developmental level of acquisition and can be acquired at any point in time Pienemann called 'variational' features. Pienemann (1981) concludes that formal instruction needs to be directed towards the ‘natural’ process of second language acquisition.

In Pienemann's (1984, 1998) study, he predicted that by following the natural order hypothesis, learners must pass through a set sequence of stages when acquiring language features. However, the instruction is only effective if the learners' interlanguage is close to the step of acquiring that structure Pienemann (1984, 1989, 1998). In addition to following natural acquisition order Pienemann (2013) argued that natural order of acquisition is unbeatable. Thus, instruction cannot make a learner to skip a stage. This means that a learner who is classified at stage 2 in a specific language feature will not benefit from instruction that is directed at learners who are at stage 4. Although, learners who are at stage 3 in a specific language feature may benefit from instruction that is directed at learners who are at stage 4. The reasoning for this is based on the learner's readiness.

Implications: Readiness 
A barrier that the teachability Hypothesis mentions that can prevent the natural development of language acquisition is 'readiness'. Second language learners will not develop and progress through the same stages at the same time. This means that a learner's readiness refers to when a learner is able to move on to the next stage in the sequence of a particular language.  The teachability Hypothesis has been used by second language researchers to understand student readiness in acquiring specific linguistic abilities.

Importance

Second language education 
The teachability hypothesis provides reasoning for the varied rate at which second languages are acquired. This hypothesis allows educational professionals such as, second language instructors to gain a sense of reasoning as to why their learners may or may not be succeeding as rapidly as their peers. It also documents the importance of teaching to a certain developmental level rather than a standard level or to age. Educational professionals can apply Pienemann's (1988) conclusion of second language learning to their lessons by designing targeted instructions to be conscientious towards student readiness for the outcome of the target learning to be successful.

Second language acquisition research 
The Teachability Hypothesis is important to the framework of psycholinguistic theories as it examines the reasoning as to why learners linguistic capabilities may not be developing at the same rate as other learners. In addition, Second language researches have been studying issues around language pedagogy. Common issues in which the Teachability Hypothesis has provided an explanation is whether and to what degree instruction helps in second language acquisition. Second language acquisition researchers will often position themselves on a scale of the importance of instruction and innate learning. There are four main positions (1) interface position, (2) Variability Hypothesis, (3) Weak Interface Position, and (4) the Teachability Hypothesis. The Teachability Hypothesis favours teaching according to natural development, it has supported second/foreign language pedagogies teaching approaches such as the Learning-Centered approach. It has also supported classroom structure, instruction time, and use of first language in the classroom. Through these perspectives on language acquisition, second language processing can be understood.

Supporting research

Comparing teaching approaches to the Teachability Hypothesis

References 

Cognitive psychology